Martillichthys is an extinct genus of pachycormiform fish, known from the late Middle Jurassic (Callovian) Oxford Clay, England. It is a member of the suspension feeding clade within the Pachycormiformes, most closely related to Asthenocormus.

References 

Pachycormiformes
Prehistoric fish genera